The following is a list of events in which convents in Spain were burned.
 Burning of convents during the French invasion as planned or spontaneous actions of the French army during the Peninsular War
 Burning of convents in Spain (1835), during the First Carlist War and subsequent ecclesiastical confiscations of Mendizábal.
 Burning of convents in Spain (1902)
 Burning of convents in Spain (1909), during the Tragic Week in Catalonia
 Burning of convents in Spain (1931), a month after the establishment of the Second Spanish Republic
 Burning of convents during the anticlerical violence of the Revolution of 1934
 Burning of convents in Spain (1936), in the months preceding the Spanish Civil War

Despite these events, Spain still holds a large amount of architectural heritage, being the country with the third most UNESCO World Heritage Sites.

See also
 Spanish confiscation
 Ensanche
 List of missing landmarks in Spain
 Church arson

Architecture in Spain
Former buildings and structures in Spain
Lists of former buildings and structures
Demolished buildings and structures in Spain
Former churches in Spain